Adolf Eduard Herstein  (1869–1932) was a painter and engraver. Born in Warsaw, he worked and taught in France, Germany (where he was active in the Berlin Secession movement) and his native Poland. His oil painting relied on the use of heavy impasto and was in style closely related to Impressionism.

In Munich in 1894 he embarked upon an affair with Franziska, Gräfin (i.e. Countess) zu Reventlow (Fanny zu Reventlow). She was pregnant with Herstein's child when in 1895 she married the politician Walter Lübke. The pregnancy ended in a miscarriage.

An engraving of his, called 'The Standard Bearer', is in the collection of the Museum of Modern Art (MOMA), New York. There are two works from the years 1914-5 held by the Brooklyn Museum, New York.

In the years 1904–1911 he was the owner of a private school of painting in Warsaw. One of his pupils was Roman Kramsztyk.

Herstein died in Berlin.

References

 Rolf Löchel, Epiphanie einer Männerphantasie. Franziska Sperrs Roman-Biographie Franziska zu Reventlows at Literaturkritik.de
 Emil Pottner: Adolf Eduard Herstein. In: Ost und West, January 1913, cols. 23–30

1869 births
1932 deaths
Artists from Warsaw
19th-century engravers
20th-century engravers
Polish engravers
19th-century Polish painters
19th-century Polish male artists
20th-century Polish painters
20th-century Polish male artists
Polish male painters